Baktybek A. Amanbaev (Kyrgyz and Russian: Аманбаев Бактыбек Абдилашимович; born 1969) has served as Kyrgyz ambassador to the United States and Canada since April 2021.

Early life and education
Amanbaev was born in 1969. Amanbaev studied at Kennesaw State University Georgia (U.S. state), United States (2012), graduated from the diplomatic academy of the Ministry of Foreign Affairs of the Kyrgyz Republic (2010), political science graduate degree from Kyrgyz National University (2010), a Master of Business Administration from the Bishkek International School of Business and Management (1998), and undergraduate degree from the Kyrgyz National University (1996).

Early career
2000–2004 – senior consultant of the member of the Jogorku Kenesh (parliament) of the Kyrgyz Republic
2000–2007 – correspondent Radio Azattyk, Kyrgyz service of Radio Free Europe/Radio Liberty
2005–2007 – director of the advertising and commercial agency of the Kyrgyz State Broadcasting Company
2005–2008 – senior lecturer of political science at the Kyrgyz National University

Public service
2010–2010 –  vice mayor of the city Osh, Kyrgyzstan’s second largest city
2011–2012 – head of the press service of the parliament (Jogorku Kenesh) of the Kyrgyz Republic
2013–2015 – ombudsman of the Kyrgyz Republic; the office of the ombudsman acts as an independent advocate for human rights on behalf of private citizens and NGOs and had the authority to recommend cases for court review

2020 Kyrgyz protests and ambassador to the USA and Canada
After the 2020 Kyrgyz protests, Amanbaev became chief of staff of the government of the Kyrgyz Republic-Minister of the Kyrgyz Republic.  In April 2021, Amanbaev was appointed ambassador extraordinary and plenipotentiary of the Kyrgyz Republic to the United States.

References

External links 

Embassy of the Kyrgyz Republic in the USA and Canada

Ambassadors of Kyrgyzstan to Canada
Ambassadors of Kyrgyzstan to the United States
Living people
People from Osh
Kyrgyzstani journalists
Academic staff of Kyrgyz National University
1969 births